In graph theory, an acyclic orientation of an undirected graph is an assignment of a direction to each edge (an orientation) that does not form any directed cycle and therefore makes it into a directed acyclic graph. Every graph has an acyclic orientation.

The chromatic number of any graph equals one more than the length of the longest path in an acyclic orientation chosen to minimize this path length. Acyclic orientations are also related to colorings through the chromatic polynomial, which counts both acyclic orientations and colorings.
The planar dual of an acyclic orientation is a totally cyclic orientation, and vice versa. The family of all acyclic orientations can be given the structure of a partial cube by making two orientations adjacent when they differ in the direction of a single edge.

Orientations of trees are always acyclic, and give rise to polytrees. Acyclic orientations of complete graphs are called transitive tournaments. The bipolar orientations are a special case of the acyclic orientations in which there is exactly one source and one sink; every transitive tournament is bipolar.

Construction
Every graph has an acyclic orientation. One way to generate an acyclic orientation is to place the vertices into a sequence, and then direct each edge from the earlier of its endpoints in the sequence to the later endpoint.
The vertex sequence then becomes a topological ordering of the resulting directed acyclic graph (DAG), and every topological ordering of this DAG generates the same orientation.

Because every DAG has a topological ordering, every acyclic orientation can be constructed in this way.
However, it is possible for different vertex sequences to give rise to the same acyclic orientation, when the resulting DAG has multiple topological orderings.
For instance, for a four-vertex cycle graph (shown), there are 24 different vertex sequences, but only 14 possible acyclic orientations.

Relation to coloring
The Gallai–Hasse–Roy–Vitaver theorem states that a graph has an acyclic orientation in which the longest path has at most  vertices if and only if it can be colored with at most  colors.

The number of acyclic orientations may be counted using the chromatic polynomial , whose value at a positive integer  is the number of -colorings of the graph.
Every graph  has exactly  different acyclic orientations,
so in this sense an acyclic orientation can be interpreted as a coloring with  colors.

Duality

Like the chromatic polynomial,

Edge flipping
The set of all acyclic orientations of a given graph may be given the structure of a partial cube, in which two acyclic orientations are adjacent whenever they differ in the direction of a single edge. This implies that when two different acyclic orientations of the same graph differ in the directions of  edges, it is possible to transform one of the orientations into the other one by a sequence of  changes of orientation of a single edge, such that each of the intermediate states of this sequence of transformations is also acyclic.

Special cases

Every orientation of a tree is acyclic. The directed acyclic graph resulting from such an orientation is called a polytree.

An acyclic orientation of a complete graph is called a transitive tournament, and is equivalent to a total ordering of the graph's vertices. In such an orientation there is in particular exactly one source and exactly one sink.

More generally, an acyclic orientation of an arbitrary graph that has a unique source and a unique sink is called a bipolar orientation.

A transitive orientation of a graph is an acyclic orientation that equals its own transitive closure. Not every graph has a transitive orientation; the graphs that do are the comparability graphs. Complete graphs are special cases of comparability graphs, and transitive tournaments are special cases of transitive orientations.

References

Graph theory objects